Heinz is an American food conglomerate based in Pittsburgh, Pennsylvania.

Heinz may also refer to:

Arts and entertainment 
 Dr. Heinz Doofenshmirtz, a fictional character from Phineas and Ferb
 Heinz Records, an independent record label based in Portland, Oregon

Institutions and organizations 
 Heinz College, a graduate school at Carnegie Mellon University in Pittsburgh
 Heinz College Australia, the international campus of Carnegie Mellon University in Adelaide, Australia
 Heinz Foundations, a group of philanthropic organizations in the United States
  Heinz Award, an annual award given by the Heinz Foundation
 Heinz Endowments, two private charitable organizations in Pennsylvania
 Heinz History Center, a regional affiliate of the Smithsonian Institution in Pittsburgh, Pennsylvania
 The Heinz Center, a nonprofit environmental institution in Washington DC

People 
 Heinz (given name), a given name (including a list of people with the given name)
 Heinz (surname), a surname (including a list of people with the surname)
 Heinz (singer) (1942–2000), stage name of German bassist and singer Burt Heinz

Places 
 Heinz Field, a football stadium in Pittsburgh, Pennsylvania
 Heinz Lofts, a building in the Troy Hill neighborhood of Pittsburgh, Pennsylvania
 John Heinz National Wildlife Refuge at Tinicum, a National Wildlife Refuge in Pennsylvania
 Heinz Hall for the Performing Arts, a performing arts center and concert hall in Pittsburgh, Pennsylvania
 Heinz Memorial Chapel, a historic property at University of Pittsburgh

Other uses 
 Heinz (bet), a type of combination bet offered by some bookmakers
 Heinz dilemma, a frequently-used moral dilemma made popular by Lawrence Kohlberg
 Heinz Chapel Choir, a choir from the University of Pittsburgh founded in 1938
 Heinz Southern 500, a NASCAR Sprint Cup Series
 Mixed-breed dog, sometimes called Heinz or Heinz 57, after the Heinz slogan company's slogan "57 varieties"

See also 
 
 Heinze (disambiguation)
 Hinz (disambiguation)